Gerd Lauck (5 July 1931 – 10 October 2005) was a German footballer who played for Borussia Neunkirchen and the Saarland national team as a defender.

References

1931 births
2005 deaths
German footballers
Saar footballers
Saarland international footballers
Saarland B international footballers
Borussia Neunkirchen players
Association football defenders